Nagaland Post is an English newspaper published from Dimapur in Nagaland in India.

Nagaland Post was established on December 3, 1990, and is currently a 12-page English daily based in Dimapur, Nagaland. According to space requirements, the newspaper is occasionally increased to 16 pages, except on Sundays. The newspaper adds a four-page supplement every Sunday called "Sunday Post" with the regular 12 page newspaper.

It is the first and highest circulated daily newspaper of Nagaland state and also the first newspaper in Nagaland to be published in multi-colour.

History

Publication
It is the first and highest circulated daily newspaper of Nagaland state and also the first newspaper in Nagaland to be published in multi-colour.

See also
List of newspapers in Nagaland

External links
Official website
Nagaland Post on Instagram

Newspapers published in Nagaland
English-language newspapers published in India
Dimapur
1990 establishments in Nagaland
Publications established in 1990
Mass media in Nagaland